Promicromonospora citrea is a bacterium from the genus Promicromonospora which has been isolated from garden soil.

References

Further reading

External links
Type strain of Promicromonospora citrea at BacDive -  the Bacterial Diversity Metadatabase	

Micrococcales
Bacteria described in 1961